Iswadi Idris (18 March 1948 in Banda Aceh, Aceh – 11 July 2008 in Jakarta) was an Indonesian footballer. He was nicknamed "Boncel" because of his small,  stature. He was captain of the Indonesian national football team from 1970 to 1980. He is the second all-time top scorer and second highest appearances records for Indonesia national team.

Career

Iswadi first international appearances with Indonesia is in the 1968 Merdeka Tournament. Iswadi became captain of the Indonesian national football team in 1970. Together with Soetjipto Soentoro, Abdul Kadir and Jacob Sihasale, he was part of what was called "Asia's fastest quartet". He played in several positions, including right back and sweeper but mostly played in attacking positions alongside Abdul Kadir.

With Indonesia, he won the 1968 Kings Cup, 1969 Merdeka Tournament, 1972 Jakarta Anniversary Cup, and 1972 Pesta Sukan. He last played for in the 1980 Olympic Games qualification. Overall he have played 97 times for Indonesia scoring 55 international goals.

He later coached the national team, and became an administrator of the PSSI.

Death
Iswadi Idris died in Jakarta, on 11 July 2008 for stroke.

Career Statistics

International goals
Scores and results list Indonesia's goal tally first, score column indicates score after each Iswadi Idris goal.

Honours

Club 

Persija Jakarta
 Perserikatan (3): 1973, 1975, 1978
 Quoc Khanh Cup (1): 1973

Country 

 King's Cup : 1968
 Merdeka Tournament : 1969
 1972 Jakarta Anniversary Tournament.
 1972 Pesta Sukan Cup

See also
List of men's footballers with 50 or more international goals

References

Further reading
 Indonesia – Record International Players – Appearances for Indonesian National Team – Iswadi Idris
 Indonesia vs Santos 1972 
 As wild as his name, PSSI Harimau 
 Harinmau mana belangmu  

1948 births
2008 deaths
Indonesian footballers
Indonesian expatriate footballers
Indonesia international footballers
PSMS Medan players
Footballers at the 1970 Asian Games
People from Banda Aceh
Association football midfielders
Expatriate soccer players in Australia
Indonesian football managers
Indonesia national football team managers
Southeast Asian Games silver medalists for Indonesia
Southeast Asian Games medalists in football
Competitors at the 1977 Southeast Asian Games
Asian Games competitors for Indonesia
Sportspeople from Aceh